Jong-seok, also spelled Jong-suk, is a Korean masculine given name. Its meaning differs based on the hanja used to write each syllable of the name. There are 19 hanja with the reading "jong" and 20 hanja with the reading "seok" on the South Korean government's official list of hanja which may be registered for use in given names.

People with this name include:
Lee Jong-seok (politician) (born 1958), South Korean politician
Lee Jong-suk (born 1989), South Korean actor

See also
List of Korean given names

References

Korean masculine given names